Sir Hugh Gurney  (4 February 1878 – 7 March 1968) was a British diplomat.

Gurney was the son of John Gurney (1845–1887), a member of the influential Quaker Gurney banking family, and Isabel Blake-Humfrey. He joined the diplomatic service and served in various early postings in Europe. From 1911 he worked as secretary to the British Embassy in Berlin. Following the outbreak of the First World War, he was appointed as First Secretary to the Embassy in Copenhagen on 16 August 1914, where he served through most of the conflict. Gurney was not popular at Copenhagen where he was accused of being timid and lacking in judgement by Ambassador Ralph Paget. When Paget took up the position of Ambassador to Brazil in the summer of 1918, the Foreign Office in London decided to remove Gurney from Copenhagen as well due to his being almost universally disliked by his subordinates. On 10 July 1918 Lord Kilmarnock replaced Gurney as First Secretary. This highly unusual move of replacing the First Secretary at the same time as the Ambassador threatened to cut short Gurney's advancement and diplomatic career, but the crisis eventually passed.

Hugh Gurney returned to Copenhagen as Ambassador to Denmark in his own right in 1933, serving until 1935. He also followed in Paget's footsteps, serving as Ambassador to Brazil from 1935 to 1939. He was invested as a Member of the Royal Victorian Order and as a Knight Commander of the Order of St Michael and St George in 1935.

He married Mariota Susan Carnegie (1892–1980), daughter of Sir Lancelot Douglas Carnegie and Marion Alice de Gourney Barclay, on 3 July 1911. Together they had two children. One of their daughters married Lord John Kerr, younger brother of Peter Kerr, 12th Marquess of Lothian.

References

1878 births
1968 deaths
Knights Commander of the Order of St Michael and St George
Members of the Royal Victorian Order
Ambassadors of the United Kingdom to Denmark
Ambassadors of the United Kingdom to Brazil
Chief Secretaries of Palestine
Hugh